Wills Hill is a mountain in Barnstable County, Massachusetts. Ockway Bay is located southeast of Wills Hill.

References

Mountains of Massachusetts
Mountains of Barnstable County, Massachusetts